Marathon Petroleum Corporation is an American petroleum refining, marketing, and transportation company headquartered in Findlay, Ohio. The company was a wholly owned subsidiary of Marathon Oil until a corporate spin-off in 2011.

Following its acquisition of Andeavor on October 1, 2018, Marathon Petroleum became the largest petroleum refinery operator in the United States, with 16 refineries and over 3 million barrels per day of refining capacity. Marathon Petroleum ranked No. 41 on the 2018 Fortune 500 list of the largest United States corporations by total revenue. In the 2020 Forbes Global 2000, Marathon Petroleum was ranked as the 197th-largest public company in the world.

Marathon Petroleum's marketing system includes branded locations across the United States, including Marathon branded outlets. MPC also owns the general partner and majority limited partner interest in MPLX LP, a midstream company which owns and operates gathering, processing, and fractionation assets, as well as crude oil and light product transportation and logistics infrastructure.

Operations

The company owns:
 16 refineries with a total crude oil throughput of 2,913,900 barrels per calendar day (bpcd):

 Leasehold or ownership interests in approximately 8,400 miles (13,500 km) of petroleum pipelines and 5,000 miles (8,050 km) of natural gas and natural gas liquids pipelines as well as related transportation and distribution assets such as railcars, barges, and processing terminals.
 A 20.4% interest, including a controlling 2% general partner interest, in MPLX, a public master limited partnership that owns pipelines and other midstream assets related to the transportation and storage of crude oil.

Former
 Marathon closed the Gallup Refinery in 2020 and is expected to complete conversion of the Martinez Refinery to a renewable fuels manufacturing facility in 2023.
 The Speedway LLC retail chain included approximately 4,000 retail outlets, and was the second largest chain of company-owned and operated retail gasoline and convenience stores in the United States. Seven & I Holdings, parent company of 7-Eleven, acquired the chain in 2020 and the sale was completed on May 14, 2021.

History
Marathon Petroleum Corporation was formed on November 9, 2009, as a subsidiary of Marathon Oil.

Predecessor company
The predecessor company of Marathon Petroleum Corporation, Marathon Petroleum Company LLC, formerly known as Marathon Ashland Petroleum LLC, was formed by the merger of the refining operations of Marathon Oil and Ashland Inc. in 1998. The merger brought together several descendents of the Standard Oil trust, as Ashland had acquired several smaller Standard spinoffs while Marathon itself was directly owned by Standard Oil. It also brought Marathon's Speedway and Ashland's SuperAmerica convenience store chains together and were subsequently merged as "Speedway SuperAmerica".

As longtime Marathon rivals  Standard Oil of Ohio and Amoco were acquired by British company BP, Marathon Ashland adopted the marketing slogan "An American Company Serving America", with the slogan being adjourned to Marathon gas pumps. In 2006, it adopted its current slogan, "Fueling the American Spirit".

In 2005, the company became a 100% owned subsidiary of Marathon Oil, after Ashland sold off its downstream assets and exited the retail business. In 2006, Marathon began using STP-branded additives in its gasoline.

In 2009, the company completed a $3.9 billion expansion of its refinery in Garyville, Louisiana, that increased the plant's capacity by 180,000 barrels per day.

In 2010, the company sold its 74,000 barrel-per-day refinery in St. Paul Park, Minnesota, along with associated terminals, pipelines, and inventory as well as 166 SuperAmerica convenience stores to Northern Tier Energy for $900 million.

Post-corporate spin-off from Marathon Oil

On June 30, 2011, Marathon Oil distributed all of its shares in the company to its shareholders via a corporate spin-off.

In June 2012, Wheeling, West Virginia-based Tri-State Petroleum signed a contract to switch 50 stations in Ohio, Pennsylvania, and West Virginia to the Marathon brand. Most of Tri-State's stations before the deal were ExxonMobil-branded stations, the majority Exxon as well as a few scattered Mobil stations in the immediate Wheeling area. Included in the deal were 18 Exxon stations in the Pittsburgh metropolitan area, significantly boosting Marathon's presence in the Pittsburgh market, where former parent company U.S. Steel is based. (Exxon would offset its Pittsburgh losses by taking over the retail contracts of several Shell stations in the area, leaving Shell with a significantly reduced presence, while the Mobil brand was withdrawn from the Northern Panhandle of West Virginia altogether.) Before the deal, Marathon had a much smaller presence in Western Pennsylvania, while having a somewhat larger presence in West Virginia and an almost ubiquitous presence in Southern Ohio.

In 2013, Marathon purchased numerous assets from BP including a 451,000 barrel per day refinery in Texas City, Texas, four light product distribution terminals, and retail marketing contracts for 1,200 retail stations throughout the southeastern United States.

In 2014, Speedway LLC, a now-former subsidiary of the company, purchased the retail operations of Hess Corporation for $2.82 billion. The deal also introduced the Marathon brand name at stations for the first time in the Northeastern United States east of the Appalachian Mountains and north of Pennsylvania. Prior to the deal, Marathon's traditional marketing territory for decades had been the Midwestern and Southeastern United States, never going further east than the Pittsburgh metropolitan area.

Refinery fire
In 2016, a fire at the Galveston Bay refinery in Texas City, Texas, injured three contract workers, resulting in a lawsuit seeking $1 million in damages. Multiple lawsuits were filed resulting in Marathon paying $86 million to settle.

2018 acquisition of Andeavor, sale of Speedway LLC
On April 30, 2018, Marathon agreed to buy Andeavor, an independent refinery and oil company based in the Western United States, for $23 billion. Marathon will acquire all of Andeavor's outstanding shares. On October 1, 2018, the merger was completed. This merger brings the SuperAmerica convenience stores back to Speedway. On October 31, 2019, Marathon announced plans to spin off their Speedway convenience stores. Gary Heminger will also retire from his role as  Marathon chairman and CEO. The deal also had the effect of introducing the Marathon brand name at stations in the Western United States for the first time and making Marathon a national brand name for the first time, as well as giving Marathon ownership of the ARCO brand.

On August 2, 2020, Marathon announced that Seven & i Holdings would be acquiring Speedway for $21 billion. The deal was anticipated to close in early 2021 pending regulatory approval. The deal closed on May 14, 2021.

Finances

References

External links

 

 
Oil companies of the United States
Automotive fuel retailers
Gas stations in the United States
Companies based in Ohio
Findlay, Ohio
American companies established in 1998
Energy companies established in 1998
Non-renewable resource companies established in 1998
Retail companies established in 1998
1998 establishments in Ohio
Corporate spin-offs
Companies listed on the New York Stock Exchange
Economy of the Eastern United States
Marathon Oil
Biofuel producers